John Jackson (29 November 1906 – 12 June 1965) was a Scottish professional footballer who played as a goalkeeper; he made over 300 appearances in the Scottish League playing for Partick Thistle and the English Football League for Chelsea.

Career
At Partick, Jackson missed only two league games in his seven seasons at Firhill between 1926 and 1933, making a total of 334 appearances for the club in all competitions. He played for the Jags in the 1930 Scottish Cup Final which they lost to Rangers after a replay, but did manage to claim winner's medals in the Glasgow Merchants Charity Cup in 1927 and the one-off Glasgow Dental Hospital Cup in 1928, both against the same opponents.

Jackson was capped by Scotland at international level on eight occasions (four while with Partick, four with Chelsea) and represented the Scottish League XI four times.

Personal life 
After retiring from football, Jackson emigrated to Nova Scotia, Canada and became a professional golfer.

Honours 
Brentford
 London War Cup: 1941–42

Career statistics

References

External links 
 

1906 births
1965 deaths
Footballers from Glasgow
Scottish footballers
Association football goalkeepers
Scottish Junior Football Association players
Kirkintilloch Rob Roy F.C. players
Partick Thistle F.C. players
Chelsea F.C. players
Scottish Football League players
English Football League players
Scotland international footballers
Scottish Football League representative players
Brentford F.C. wartime guest players
Scottish emigrants to Canada
Aldershot F.C. wartime guest players
Portsmouth F.C. wartime guest players
Queens Park Rangers F.C. wartime guest players
Tottenham Hotspur F.C. wartime guest players